The 2011 FINA Diving World Series is the 2011 edition of  FINA Diving World Series. It is the 2011 World Series competition of the world class divers who were champions, runners-up or finalists from the previous World Series, World Championship, World Cup and Olympics. Although that is the case, some of the participants are wild-card entries who represented certain countries which had previously qualified athletes for the said World Series. This World Series was hosted by four countries, namely first leg in Moscow, Russia, second leg in Beijing, China, third leg in Sheffield, Great Britain, and fourth leg in Guanajuato, Mexico.

Overall medal tally

Moscow leg

Medal table

Medal summary

Men

Women

Beijing leg

Medal table

Medal summary

Men

Women

Sheffield leg

Medal table

Medal summary

Men

Women

Guanajuato leg

Medal table

Medal summary

Men

Women 

 
2011 in diving
FINA Diving World Series